Mineral Spring is an unincorporated community in Barry County, in the U.S. state of Missouri.

History
A variant name was Panacea. A post office called Panacea was established in 1880, the name was changed to Mineral Spring in 1895, and the post office closed in 1940. The community was named for a mineral spring near the original town site.

References

Unincorporated communities in Barry County, Missouri
Unincorporated communities in Missouri